Amor en Custodia is a Colombian telenovela by Teleset for RCN Television, starring Alejandra Borrero and Venezuelan Ernesto Calzadilla. It premiered on November 9, 2009 on RCN TV.

Synopsis 

It tells the story of love and passion of a mother and daughter, Peace and Barbara, by their bodyguards, Juan Manuel and Nicolas, respectively. Their relations are imbued with much drama as this love is not allowed, not only because of jealousy and envy, but because of past mistakes of their respective families.

Cast

Production 

The male protagonists trained under Horacio Tavera (stage combat) and Gildardo Romero, professor of Hapkido (Korean martial art) who are responsible for choreographing the scenes of confrontation and teach weapons handling.

Remake 

In 2012 and 2013, Nicandro Díaz Gonzalez produced Amores verdaderos, a Mexican telenovela for Televisa. Eduardo Yáñez, Erika Buenfil, Sebastian Rulli and Eiza González star as the protagonists. Marjorie de Sousa and Guillermo Capetillo star as the antagonists.

Colombian telenovelas
Spanish-language telenovelas
Television series by Teleset